Léonice Huet (born 21 May 2000) is a French badminton player. Born in Dieppe, Seine-Maritime, she started her career in BadBonneval club, and in 2014 joined the CLT Orléans. She won her first senior international title at the 2016 Latvia International tournament in the mixed doubles event at the age of 16. Huet was part of the national junior team that won the mixed team title at the 2017 and 2018 European Junior Championships. She participated at the 2018 Summer Youth Olympics, helps the team Omega took the silver medal in the mixed team event.

Achievements

BWF International Challenge/Series (2 titles, 1 runner-up) 
Women's singles

Mixed doubles

  BWF International Challenge tournament
  BWF International Series tournament
  BWF Future Series tournament

References

External links 
 

2000 births
Living people
Sportspeople from Dieppe, Seine-Maritime
French female badminton players
Badminton players at the 2018 Summer Youth Olympics